Coleophora maculipennella is a moth of the family Coleophoridae. It is found in Afghanistan.

References

maculipennella
Moths described in 1967
Moths of Asia